Alpha Tau Omega Fraternity House, also known as Maltese Manor, is a historic fraternity house located at Purdue University in West Lafayette, Tippecanoe County, Indiana.  It was built in 1920, and is a -story, rectangular, Tudor Revival style brick and stone building.  It has a truncated hipped roof, parapeted tower, and platform porch extending across the front facade.  A one-story kitchen addition was built in 1940, and a three-story addition in 1963.  The building was remodeled in 1995, after a fire on the second and third floors.  It housed the Indiana Gamma Omicron chapter of Alpha Tau Omega fraternity from its construction until May 2021.

It was listed on the National Register of Historic Places in 2002.

References

Purdue University
Residential buildings on the National Register of Historic Places in Indiana
Tudor Revival architecture in Indiana
Houses completed in 1920
Buildings and structures in Tippecanoe County, Indiana
National Register of Historic Places in Tippecanoe County, Indiana
Fraternity and sorority houses